Rajendra Gavai is the President of Republican Party of India (Gavai). Occupation	Physician, Politician.

Early life and education
He is the son of the late Kerala Governor R.S. Gavai. obtain M.B.B.S. from Govt. Medical College, Nagpur in 1986. He is from Maharashtra.

Career
Gavai is also a medical doctor.

References

Living people
Marathi politicians
Dalit politicians
Medical doctors from Maharashtra
Republican Party of India politicians
Maharashtra local politicians
Year of birth missing (living people)